The 2017 Cotton Bowl Classic was a college football bowl game played on January 2, 2017, at AT&T Stadium in Arlington, Texas. It featured the Western Michigan Broncos from the Mid-American Conference and the Wisconsin Badgers from the Big Ten Conference. The 81st Cotton Bowl Classic was one of the New Years Six bowl games in the College Football Playoff for the 2016–17 bowl games concluding the 2016 FBS football season.

The game was broadcast on ESPN, ESPN Deportes, ESPN Radio and XM Satellite Radio. It was sponsored by the Goodyear Tire and Rubber Company and was officially known as the Goodyear Cotton Bowl Classic.

Teams
Mid-American Conference (MAC) champion Western Michigan was selected as an at-large as the highest ranked College Football Playoff (CFP) Group of Five team while Wisconsin was chosen as an at-large out of the Big Ten Conference. Wisconsin was an 8 point favorite to start the game.

This was the fifth meeting between the schools, with Wisconsin leading the all-time series 4–1.  The most recent meeting was on August 31, 2000, where the Badgers defeated the Broncos by a score of 19–7.  This was the first Cotton Bowl for both teams.

With Western Michigan representing the MAC, this was the first Cotton Bowl Classic to feature a MAC team.

Game summary

Scoring summary

Statistics

References

2016–17 NCAA football bowl games
2017
2017
2017
2017 in sports in Texas
21st century in Arlington, Texas
January 2017 sports events in the United States